Happy Times! Sing Along with Mitch is an album by Mitch Miller and The Gang. It was released in 1960 on the Columbia label (catalog nos. CL-1568 and CS-8368).

The album debuted on Billboard magazine's popular albums chart on March 13, 1961, peaked at No. 5, and remained on that chart for 23 weeks. It was certified as a gold record by the RIAA.

Track listing
Side 1
 Medley: "That's My Weakness Now" and "Last Night On The Back Porch"
 Medley: "I Love My Baby, My Baby Loves Me" and "If You Knew Susie"
 "Indiana"
 Medley: "Where Do You Work-A, John" and "Yes! We Have No Bananas"
 Medley: "Collegiate" and "Alabamy Bound"
 "The Trail of the Lonesome Pine"

Side 2
 "My Melancholy Baby"
 "Side by Side"
 "Anniversary Song"
 "Wagon Wheels"
 "The Prisoner's Song"
 "Beautiful Ohio"

References

1961 albums
Columbia Records albums
Mitch Miller albums